Daijon Cotty Davis (born August 3, 1999), known professionally as DC the Don, is an American rapper, singer, and songwriter from Milwaukee, Wisconsin. Aside from his work as a rapper, he is also noted as being a former basketball player playing with the Amateur Athletic Union organization.

Early life 
Davis started writing songs at 8 years old. He recalls dancing to tracks from American singer Michael Jackson during his youth. During his teens, he played basketball with the Amateur Athletic Union alongside future NBA player LaMelo Ball, whom he befriended, and his brothers Lonzo and LiAngelo Ball. In 2018, he was listed a 3-star recruit by ESPN.

Career 
In October 2017, Davis released his single "Everything 1K" which caught the attention of NBA player Lonzo Ball. He recalls making the song in ten minutes. In February 2019, he released his single "3AM Freestyle" on the WorldStarHipHop YouTube channel. Davis also signed to Run Music LLC that is family owned, but label issues began to arise and he started his departure from Run Music in 2019 making the phrase "FREE DC" to gain attention to the situation. He was released from his contract in mid 2020, and is now currently signed to Rostrum Records. In 2020, his song "Worst Day" gained traction after its release on the deluxe version of his debut album, "Come As You Are". In August 2021, he released his single "Notice Me". In September 2021, he released a single titled "What Now?". In January 2022, he was scheduled to perform alongside frequent collaborator Sad Frosty in Houston, Texas but was unable due to the latter ultimately passing away in the days preceding the performance. In February 2022, he released a single titled "PSA" as the final single for his second album,  "My Own Worst Enemy". In May 2022, he appeared on American rapper yvngxchris' album Virality on the track "QuikkSkope". In October 2022, he released a single with American rapper midwxst titled "Suicide".

Discography

Studio albums

Mixtapes 
 F*ck Hell (2018)
 DC Dahmer (2018)
 SACRED HEART (2022)

Extended plays 
 Halloween on 47th Street (2017)
 Thank You Jahseh (2018)
 Just a Kid From Milwaukee (2018)
 DC Run Music (2018)
 DC Fridays (2019)

Singles

As lead artist

References

External links 
 
 

1999 births
Living people
21st-century African-American male singers
American hip hop singers
American pop singers
American punk rock singers
African-American male rappers
African-American male singer-songwriters
Musicians from Milwaukee
Pop rappers
Rappers from Wisconsin
Singer-songwriters from Wisconsin
Southern hip hop musicians
Trap musicians